Lizel Moore (born 29 June 1970 in Bloemfontein) is an athlete from South Africa, who competes in triathlon.

Moore competed at the first Olympic triathlon at the 2000 Summer Olympics.  She took thirtieth place with a total time of 2:08:18.19.

References

1970 births
Living people
Sportspeople from Bloemfontein
Olympic triathletes of South Africa
South African female triathletes
Triathletes at the 2000 Summer Olympics
University of Queensland alumni
20th-century South African women
21st-century South African women